Ntuppuppakkoranendarnnu (My Granddad Had an Elephant!) is a short novel by Vaikom Muhammad Basheer published in 1951. It is one of the most famous among his works. The story is woven around the love of Kunjupattumma for Nisar Ahmed. But the dominant character is Kunjupattumma's mother who gloats over the glory that was, and the central theme is the conflict between the value she upholds and those of the educated, forward-looking Nissar Ahmed. The story is filled with pleasant humour and anecdotes from Muslim religious lore.

The title refers to people boasting of the past glories, their "grandfather's elephant", to hide their present shortcomings. Ronald E. Asher translated the work into English under the title Me Grandad 'ad an Elephant.

References

Novels by Vaikom Muhammad Basheer
1951 novels
Malayalam novels
Novels set in Kerala
1951 Indian novels